TVBS-Asia is a satellite cable channel operated by TVBS in Taiwan, launched on June 2, 1997, but only broadcasts abroad.

See also
TVBS-NEWS
TVBS Entertainment Channel

External links
 TVBS-Asia official website

Television stations in Taiwan
Television channels and stations established in 1997